Novokuznetsk (literally: "new smith's", Aba-tura) is a city in Kemerovo Oblast (Kuzbass) in south-western Siberia, Russia. It is the second largest city in the oblast, after Kemerovo. Population: 

It was previously known as Kuznetsk until 1931, and as Stalinsk until 1961.

History
Founded in 1618 by men from Tomsk as a Cossack ostrog (fort) on the Tom River, it was initially called Kuznetsky ostrog. It became the seat of Kuznetsky Uyezd in 1622. Kuznetsk was granted town status in 1689. It was here that Fyodor Dostoevsky married his first wife, Maria Isayeva (1857). Joseph Stalin's rapid industrialization of the Soviet Union transformed the sleepy town into a major coal mining and industrial center in the 1930s. It merged with Sad Gorod in 1931. In 1931–1932, the city was known as Novokuznetsk and between 1932 and 1961 as Stalinsk, after Stalin.

Climate
Novokuznetsk has a fairly typical southwest Siberian humid continental climate (Köppen climate classification: Dfb) with warm summers during which most of the precipitation occurs, and severe, generally dry winters. Snowfall is very frequent during the winter, but its water content is generally very low due to the cold temperatures.

Administrative and municipal status
Within the framework of administrative divisions, Novokuznetsk serves as the administrative center of Novokuznetsky District, even though it is not a part of it. As an administrative division, it is incorporated separately as Novokuznetsk City Under Oblast Jurisdiction—an administrative unit with the status equal to that of the districts. As a municipal division, Novokuznetsk City Under Oblast Jurisdiction is incorporated as Novokuznetsky Urban Okrug.

City districts
Kuybyshevsky
Kuznetsky
Novoilyinsky
Ordzhonikidzevsky
Tsentralny (Central)
Zavodsky

Education
Siberian State Industrial University
Novokuznetsk branch of Kemerovo State University
State Institute for Physicians Postgraduate Training (also known as Novokuznetsk Postgraduate Physician Institute), Russian Ministry of Health
Novokuznetsk Scientific Center of Medicosocial Expert Evaluation and Rehabilitation of Invalids, Federal Agency for Public Health and Social welfare
Institute of General Problems of Hygiene and Occupational Diseases, Russian Academy of Medical Sciences

Industry
Novokuznetsk is a heavily industrial city and is located in the heart of the Kuzbass region. Factories in the city include:
West-Siberian Metal Plant
Novokuznetsk Iron and Steel Plant
Factory "Kuznetsk ferroalloys"
Novokuznetsk aluminium factory

Sports
Metallurg Novokuznetsk is an ice hockey team based in Novokuznetsk. Formerly a member of the Kontinental Hockey League, the team is currently a member of the Supreme Hockey League. The football team of the same name was recently promoted to the Russian first division below the premier.

RC Novokuznetsk compete in the Professional Rugby League, the highest division of rugby union in Russia.

Florida Panthers goaltender Sergei Bobrovsky, Washington Capitals defenseman Dmitry Orlov and Minnesota Wild winger Kirill Kaprizov were all born in Novokuznetsk and began their pro careers with Metallurg Novokuznetsk.

Novokuznetsk is also the birthplace of US chess Grandmaster Gata Kamsky.

Transportation
The main airport is the Spichenkovo Airport. The city is also a major railway junction with both local and long-distance trains. Local public transport is provided by trams, buses, and trolleybuses.

Twin towns and sister cities

Novokuznetsk is twinned with:
 Nizhny Tagil, Russia
 Zaporizhzhia, Ukraine
 Pittsburgh, United States
 Banbury, United Kingdom

Notable people
 
 
Sergei Abramov, ice hockey player 
Sergei Bobrovsky (born 1988), ice hockey player
Margarita Chernousova (born 1996), a sport shooter
Maksim Chevelev (born 1990), professional football player
Evgeny Chigishev (born 1979), a former weightlifter and Olympic silver medalist
Andrey Dementyev (born 1970), a former professional football player
Kirill Kaprizov (born 1997), ice hockey player
Maxim Kitsyn (born 1991), a professional ice hockey player
Ana Kriégel, Russian-born Irish murder victim
Anna Litvinova (1983–2013), a fashion model and beauty pageant title holder
Aleksandr Melikhov (born 1998), a professional football player
Kostyantyn Milyayev (born 1987), a Ukrainian Olympic platform diver
Vadim Mitryakov (born 1991), a professional ice hockey player
Nikita Morgunov (born 1975), a former professional basketball player
Albert Nasibulin (born 1972), a material scientist
Dmitry Orlov (born 1991), ice hockey player
Maksim Pichugin (born 1974), a Winter Olympic cross-country skier
Anton Rekhtin (born 1989), a professional ice hockey player
Artyom Sapozhkov (born 1990), a former professional football player
Stanislav Sel'skiy (born 1991), a rugby union player
Denis Simplikevich (born 1991), a rugby union player
Kirill Skachkov (born 1987), an Olympic table tennis player
Denis Stasyuk (born 1985), ice hockey player
Daniil Tarasov (born 1999), ice hockey player
Ivan Telegin (born 1992), ice hockey player and Winter Olympic gold medalist
Arkady Vainshtein (born 1942), a Russian-American theoretical physicist
Vladimir Vilisov (born 1976), a Winter Olympic cross-country skier
Maxim Zyuzyakin (born 1991), a professional ice hockey player
Pavel Silyagin (born 1993, professional boxer

Gallery

References

Notes

Sources

External links

 Official website of Novokuznetsk
Siberian State Industrial University (SIBSIU)
 Life in Novokuznetsk
 Informational website of Novokuznetsk

 
Cities and towns in Kemerovo Oblast
Tomsk Governorate
Populated places established in 1618
1618 establishments in Russia
De-Stalinization